"Right on Target" is a 1982 single by Paul Parker. It was released on Megatone Records.

Background
The song was produced and written by Patrick Cowley in the Hi-NRG style. It was the lead single from Parker's debut album Too Much To Dream. "Right on Target" was his first and most successful dance chart entry. The track hit number one for two weeks. It was the first of two singles to make it to the top spot.

References

1982 singles
Hi-NRG songs
Songs written by Patrick Cowley
1982 songs